The GMA is a 4.0-litre, naturally-aspirated V12 engine, commissioned by Gordon Murray, and developed and produced by Cosworth for the Gordon Murray Automotive T.50 & Gordon Murray Automotive T.33 sports cars. The engine is also more powerful than the  S70/2 V12 engine used in the McLaren F1, making more power from four litres than the S70/2 engine made from 6.1 litres.

Background
For its first vehicle, GMA enlisted trusted engine designer Cosworth, who had worked alongside Murray in the past, to design, produce and manufacture a brand new exclusive V12 engine to power the T.50.

Cosworth's outline commissioned by GMA was simple; the engine had to be lightweight. It had to have the quickest response time of any engine ever designed for road use, replicating the goals set for the renowned McLaren F1. Cosworth was tasked with delivering the highest-revving engine ever made for a production car with unrivalled power-to-weight. The brief also extended to aesthetics and aural experience by creating a unique V12 with great sound quality and visual aesthetics. It uses a streamlined design with no coverings or belt-driven ancillaries. A special focus was given to offering the purest driving experience, in keeping with the prevailing ethos of the T.50. Alongside being able to deliver supreme performance, the engine was also required to meet modern emissions standards.

An important part of the outline was to make the displacement of the T.50’s engine as small as possible. With a clear view of the necessary torque and acceleration and the aim of a vehicle weight under 1,000 kg, they proposed the capacity to be just 3.9-litres while still accomplishing supercar-like performance. It will be the highest-revving, quickest responding, most power per litre, and lightest naturally-aspirated V12 engine ever fitted to a road car. Meticulously engineered and produced, the unit combines the collective knowledge and expertise of Gordon Murray and Cosworth to be the most unique, engaging, and driver-oriented V12 engine ever manufactured.

The T.50’s version of the GMA V12 engine generates high-end power of 663 PS (654 hp) at 11,500 rpm, and it is also said to be compliant for everyday use. The maximum torque figure of 467 Nm (344 ft-lb) is produced at 9,000 rpm, but the solution to guaranteeing everyday usability is that 71% of the engine’s available torque will be offered from as low as 2,500 rpm. The T.50 engine delivers the highest power per unit displacement of any naturally-aspirated road car engine ever created, at 166 PS per litre. This feat, along with how light the unit is, puts this motor right at the top of naturally aspirated powertrain development. To achieve the lowest weight possible the block in the T.50 is constructed from a high-strength aluminium alloy, the crankshaft is made from steel, weighing in at only 13 kg (29 lb), and the connecting rods and valves are built from titanium, same with the clutch housing. All of these factors contribute to an engine weight of only 178 kg (392 lb), which is an additional record for a road car.

Variants
A more powerful, track-only, racing version of the GMA engine will also be produced, and is set to be used in a racing-focused variant of the T.50, called the Gordon Murray Automotive T.50s Niki Lauda. This output raises even further, to  @ 11,500 rpm, thanks to a ram-air intake. The racing version of the GMA engine also has had various tweaks, including the catalytic converters from the exhaust system removed, narrower inconel walls, and smaller mufflers, now weighing . It's  lighter than the T.50's engine, making it the lightest V12 engine of all time.

Engine specifications
Engine type: V12
Capacity: 
V angle (deg.): 65° 
Aspiration: Naturally-aspirated
Bore: 81.5 mm (3.2 in.)
Stroke: 63.8 mm (2.5 in.)
Compression ratio: 14:1
Max power output:  @ 10,500 rpm-11,500 rpm
Max torque output:  @ 9,000 rpm
Flexibility: 71-75% of max torque at 2,500 rpm
Maximum rpm: 12,100 rpm
Valvetrain: double overhead camshafts, inclined axis, 4 valves per cylinder – variable valve timing on inlet / exhaust
Induction system: RAM induction airbox – 4 throttle bodies – Direct Path Induction Sound
Exhaust system: Inconel and Titanium
Lubrication system: dry sump
Cooling system: water-cooled – twin-aluminium front radiators
Oil cooling system: Single aluminium rear radiator
Ignition system: 12 individual coils, 12-volt
Exhaust emission control: 4 catalytic converters with lambda sensors and secondary air injection
Engine block: Aluminium alloy
Cylinder heads: Aluminium alloy
Connecting rods: Titanium
Valves: Titanium
Total engine weight: 
Engine mounting: Semi-structural-inclined axis shear mounting (IASM) 
Power density: 166 PS per litre

Applications
Gordon Murray Automotive T.50
Gordon Murray Automotive T.33

References

External links

Cosworth
V12 engines